The River Hull is a navigable river in the East Riding of Yorkshire in Northern England. It rises from a series of springs to the west of Driffield, and enters the Humber Estuary at Kingston upon Hull. Following a period when the Archbishops of York charged tolls for its use, it became a free navigation. The upper reaches became part of the Driffield Navigation from 1770, after which they were again subject to tolls, and the section within the city of Hull came under the jurisdiction of the Port of Hull, with the same result.

Most of its course is through low-lying land that is at or just above sea level, and regular flooding has been a long-standing problem along the waterway. Drainage schemes to alleviate it were constructed on both sides of the river. The Holderness Drainage scheme to the east was completed in 1772, with a second phase in 1805, and the Beverley and Barmston Drain to the west was completed in 1810. Since 1980, the mouth of the river has been protected by a tidal barrier at the estuary, which can be closed to prevent tidal surges entering the river system and causing flooding upriver.

Most of the bridges which cross the river are movable, to allow shipping to pass. There are six swing bridges; four bascule bridges, two of which have twin leaves, one for each carriageway of the roads which they carry; and three Scherzer lift bridges, which are a type of rolling bascule bridge. The former Scott Street Bridge (taken out of use 1994 and dismantled 2020) was originally powered from a high pressure water main maintained by the first public power distribution company in the world.

Etymology
The name Hull is probably of Brittonic origin. The name may derive from *hūl, an element related to *hū- meaning "boil, soak, seethe" (< Old Celtic *seu-; c.f. River Sill in Europe).

Course
The source of the River Hull is in the Yorkshire Wolds. It rises from a series of springs to the west of Driffield, near the site of the medieval village of Elmswell. The Elmswell Beck flows eastwards from these, and is joined by the Little Driffield Beck, which flows southwards from Little Driffield. It continues as the Driffield Beck, flowing around the south-western edge of Driffield, where it is joined by the Driffield Trout Stream. After the junction, it becomes the River Hull or the West Beck and flows to the east, before turning south to reach Corps Landing. For much of the route below Driffield, the Driffield Navigation runs parallel to the river.

The river from Corps Landing to its mouth is navigable. At Emmotland, it is joined by the Frodingham Beck, which is also navigable, and leads to the canal into Driffield, which forms the major part of the Driffield Navigation. Scurf Dyke joins from the west and is followed by Struncheon Hill lock, which marks the end of the Navigation, and the official start of the navigable River Hull. Below here, the river is tidal. Just above the lock, the Beverley and Barmston Drain, which collects water from the catchwater drains on either side of the main channel, flows under the navigation in a tunnel, and runs just to the west of the river almost to its mouth. Below the lock, the surrounding land is almost at sea level, and the river is constrained by flood banks on both sides.

On its route southwards, the river passes the former junction with Aike Beck, once navigable to Lockington Landing, but the stream was subsequently re-routed to join the Arram Beck. The Leven Canal used to join on the east bank, but the entrance lock has been replaced by a sluice. The Arram Beck flows in from the west, and then the river is crossed by Hull Bridge, the cause of repeated disagreement between the owners of the Driffield Navigation and the Corporation of Beverley, who owned the bridge. Just above Beverley Beck, which joins from the west, is Grovehill Bridge, now a lift bridge but once a ferry bridge.

Once the river reaches the outskirts of Hull, its course is marked by a series of bridges, most of which open to allow boats to pass. There are swing bridges, lift bridges and bascule bridges, and the river becomes part of the Port of Hull. The river, which is the dividing line between West and East Hull, bisects the city's industrial area. The bridges can cause traffic delays during high tides, though river traffic is less than it once was. The Beverley and Barmston Drain rejoins the river above Scott Street Bridge. Below North Bridge, an unused dry dock on the west bank marks the former entrance to Queens Dock. Below Drypool Bridge, a muddy basin on the east bank was once the entrance to Drypool Basin and Victoria Dock. The river reaches its confluence with the Humber Estuary in the centre of Kingston upon Hull. At its mouth, a tidal barrier has been constructed to prevent tidal surges from entering the river. In the past, these had regularly flooded the town and the flat countryside to the north.

History
The River Hull has served as a navigation and a drainage channel, and has been subject to the conflicts that this usually creates, as water levels need to be raised for navigation, but lowered for efficient drainage. In 1213, the Archbishops of York laid claim to the river, and declared their right to navigate on a  channel. A number of fish-weirs made navigation difficult, and the Archbishop negotiated their removal in 1296, so that a wharf could be established at Grovehill to serve the town of Beverley. By 1321, river rights had been extended to the charging of tolls. One-third of a shilling (4d equivalent to 1.7p decimal currency) was charged for each bushel carried on the river between Emmotland and the Humber, but the merchants of Hull were unhappy with this; eventually the river had free navigation, and goods could be carried on it without toll. The Arram Beck was also exempt from all tolls.

The outlet of the river onto the Humber is thought to have changed in the early medieval period. The original outlet has been identified at a place called Limekiln creek. A second channel Sayers Creek was cut or widened, with both outlets existing simultaneously at one point. Limekiln creek was subsequently reduced in flow to the level of a drain.

The lower river was bordered by salt marshes in medieval times, when efforts were first made to drain them. Further upstream, channels were cut through the fens in the twelfth and thirteenth centuries by the monks of Meaux Abbey, primarily to enable travel by boat, but these gradually became part of the drainage system. John Smeaton, when asked by the merchants of Driffield to advise on ways to allow keels to reach their town, suggested a small cut of about  including one lock, from the river near Wansford. When fully opened in 1770, the new route was some  shorter than the river, which follows an extremely winding course in its upper reaches. The river above Aike was now considered to be part of the Driffield Navigation, and tolls were charged for its use. Also in this period the first cut of the Holderness Drain was made, enabled by an act of 1764, originally outfalling onto the river.

Although beyond their jurisdiction, the Navigation commissioners attempted to extend their powers, to improve the river below the junction with Aike Beck. They particularly wanted to replace the stone Hull Bridge, near Beverley, with a swing bridge, which would make it easier for keels to reach Frodingham bridge. The Corporation of Beverley objected, because the bridge was the main route of communication between Beverley and Holderness, and the commissioners instead dredged parts of the river to improve access. Plans to improve Hull Bridge were again resisted by Beverley Corporation in 1799, but an agreement was finally reached in 1801, and an Act of Parliament was obtained in July of that year. William Chapman acted as engineer, as the act authorised the construction of towpaths, a new cut between Bethels Bridge and the lock at Struncheon Hill, to avoid a long loop in the river, and rebuilding of the bridge. The bridge cost £500, half of which was met by Richard Bethell, the owner of the Leven Canal, on condition that the tolls for passing through it were reduced significantly.

Passage through Hull had long been difficult, because of the number of ships which used the river for loading and unloading goods. In 1794, the merchants of Beverley had advocated the building of docks at Hull, with a separate entrance, so that traffic to the upper river would not be impeded, while the Driffield Navigation had unsuccessful attempted to get a clause inserted into the Act of Parliament which the Hull Dock Company obtained in 1840, to ensure free passage for vessels, and the removal of tolls for boats not using the docks. The Navigation Company also received complaints from the Beverley and Barmston Drainage Commissioners, who believed that water levels were being kept at a higher level than was good for drainage.

In 1980, the Environment Agency constructed a tidal barrier at the mouth of the river. The structure spans the river, and a huge steel gate, weighing 202 tonnes, can be lowered into the waterway, effectively sealing the river from the Humber, and preventing tidal surges from moving up the river and flooding parts of the city and the low-lying areas beyond. The gate was initially lowered about twelve times a year, and protects around 17,000 properties. In 2009, a £10 million upgrade of the structure was started, to ensure it would stay operational for a further 30 years. The upgrade included a new drive mechanism, which raises and lowers the gate, and pivots it when it is at the top of the structure, so that it lies horizontally rather than vertically. It also included a new control system. In July 2017 the barrier was granted Grade II listed status. Plans have been considered to build a barrage at the mouth of the Hull where it joins the Humber Estuary to maintain a constant water level as it passes through the city. The idea was first raised by the Abercrombie report, which considered how to redevelop Hull after significant destruction during the Second World War. The estimated cost of such a project was around £195 million in 2007.

Traffic

Because the river was a free river, there are no figures for traffic on the lower river. However, it connected to a number of waterways on which tolls were collected, and so an indication of the traffic can be gained from the figures for these waterways. The main cargoes on Beverley Beck in 1730 were coal, bricks, turfs and wool, together with cereal crops, consisting of wheat, barley, oats and malt. Receipts from tolls more than doubled between 1732 and 1748, after which the tolls were let to an independent collector. The annual rent charged for this privilege doubled again between 1748 and 1792. There was a steady expansion of trade on the Driffield Navigation during the same period, as the dividends paid to shareholders rose from 1.5 to 4 per cent. In 1789, Bainton, Boyes and Co negotiated a lump sum payment to cover coal from the Aire and Calder Navigation to their new carpet factory and the export of their carpets in the downstream direction. The factory later became a corn mill.

Toll rentals continued to increase on the Beverley Beck, rising from £190 to £435 between 1793 and 1835. Some 31,185 tons of cargo were carried in 1838.
In 1817, a steam packet service started to run between Driffield and Hull. Three return trips each week were made, but the journey times were too long, and an advertisement in 1825 indicated that the engine had been altered and an express steam packet service would commence. Three boats were recorded as trading between Driffield and Hull every other day in a directory of Yorkshire published in 1823. Traffic for 1832 included 7,394 chaldrons of coal, 18,173 quarters of wheat, 7,745 quarters of oats, 19,396 quarters of barley and 4,555 sacks of flour. An additional 1,564 quarters of wheat and 8,194 sacks of flour were carried to or from Foston Mill, reached from Frodingham Beck. A regular carrier also operated between the Leven Canal and Hull once a week.

Between 1848 and 1905, traffic on Beverley Beck more than trebled, from 33,498 tons to 101,540 tons. Coal and other minerals accounted for around one quarter of the traffic in 1905, while goods carried in 1906 included fertiliser, burnt ore, flour and scrap metal. Commercial traffic continued into the 1970s, when tolls of £2,365 were collected on 28,169 tons of cargo. Traffic on the Driffield Navigation was relatively steady between 1871 and 1905, falling slightly from 35,654 to 32,666 tons. Goods carried included coal, linseed, cottonseed, wheat, flour and artificial manures. In 1922, £7 of income was received from pleasure craft using the navigation. Traffic declined during the 1930s, with commercial traffic finally ceasing in 1944. The Leven Canal carried 4,242 tons in 1888 and 4,546 in 1905, but then succumbed to road competition, and closed in 1935.

Drainage

The problems of flooding of the land adjacent to the river were addressed by the construction of catchwater drains to both sides of it. The east side of the river was protected by the Holderness Drainage scheme. John Grundy worked on plans for the scheme which would protect  of low-lying land to the north-east of Hull. John Smeaton was also involved, although the final report was largely Grundy's work, and an Act of Parliament to authorise the work was passed on 5 April 1764. The Trustees for the scheme wrote to Grundy and Smeaton in May 1764, asking them to work on the project. Grundy's wife had died only a fortnight previously, and the two engineers corresponded, but besides valuable comment on Grundy's plans for the outfall sluice, Smeaton had no further involvement, and it was Grundy who ran the project, which included  of barrier bank along the east side of the river. John Hoggard acted as Superintendent for the scheme, while Joseph Page was appointed as resident engineer, to oversee the construction of the drains and the outfall sluice. Grundy made regular visits until October 1767, by which time the sluice and the main drainage channels were completed, at which point he and Page moved on, while Hoggard oversaw additional work on the drains and banks, which lasted for several more years. By the time of its completion in 1772, the scheme had cost £24,000.

Despite the Holderness scheme, there were still problems near Leven and Weel, and William Jessop spent a month inspecting the area before writing a report in July 1786. His plan advocated separating the water which fell on the uplands to the north and flowed through the low-lying areas, from the local drainage of those low-lying areas. George Plummer carried out most of the subsequent survey work on Jessop's behalf, although Jessop surveyed the River Hull in 1787, to identify how the outfall could be improved. Jessop visited the works from time to time, making seven visits between 1789 and 1792, while the day to day oversight of the scheme was handled by Plummer as resident engineer. Plummer was succeeded by Anthony Bower, who was engineer from 1792 to 1795, and the whole scheme was completed in 1805, having cost £16,000.

In 1796, Robert Chapman was asked to report on possible solutions for flooding to the west. His report formed the basis for the Beverley and Barmston Drainage Act, which was passed by Parliament in June 1798. At Hull, an outfall sluice was constructed, and the drain passed through tunnels under eleven waterways, including the Beverley Beck. 27 bridges were built to carry roads over the drain, and the whole project was finished in 1810.

River crossings

There are several bridges in the Hull area which cross the River Hull. Details of them are shown in the following table, starting from that furthest north and moving south to the river mouth.

The present Drypool Bridge was designed by W. Morris, the Hull City Engineer, and it was built in Hull. It was closed in May 1959, so that it could be demolished and Morris's new bridge opened in March 1961.

Scott Street Bridge had gradually deteriorated, and a public consultation was held in 1986, to determine its future. By that time a 10-ton weight limit had been imposed on traffic using the bridge, because of its poor structural state. Three suggestions were made as to its future. These were to close and demolish it, to refurbish it at an estimated cost of £1.6 million, and to build a new bridge on the same site but a different alignment, to eliminate the awkward turn at the west end, which was costed at £2 million. None of these actions have been taken, as the bridge leaves were raised in 1994, and have remained raised ever since. Consideration was given in 2007 to preserving two of the hydraulic rams which operated the bridge, during planning to demolish the structure. The Hull Hydraulic Power Company was set up in 1872, and by 1876 was operating a pumping station on Machell Street. This supplied water to a high pressure main which ran from Wellington Street to Sculcoates Bridge, and was used by local industries to power machinery, including the bridge when it was constructed. Although the power company closed in the 1940s, it made Hull the first city in the world to have a public system of power distribution.

The design for the Ennerdale Link road included a tunnel under the river. Initial investigations suggested that there was a layer of boulder clay below the alluvium of the river bed, and that a chalk aquifer was below the clay. Construction work started in July 1991. A cofferdam was built on the east bank, and the cutting which would have provided access to the twin-bore tunnel was nearly excavated when a  hole appeared in the river bed, and the entire site flooded. A 3-month investigation took place, which suggested that it would be difficult to finish the tunnel and maintain the integrity of the aquifer. Despite some £10 million having been spent on the project, it was abandoned in 1993. A contract for a replacement bridge was awarded in June 1995 and the river was crossed by twin lift bridges, which were opened in April 1997. The project had cost £30 million, compared to an original budget of just £13 million.

A tunnel was successfully constructed under the river in 2001. It was excavated using two tunnelling machines, which were manufactured in Canada and were named Maureen and Gloria. The tunnel was officially opened on 21 August 2001, when a Mini car was driven through it, recreating scenes from the film The Italian Job.
Before 1897, there had been a ferry at Grovehill, and a shipyard on the east bank, owned by Joseph Scarr. To assist his workers to reach the shipyard, Scarr designed and built a ferry bridge, which cost him £300. It consisted of a large rectangular pontoon, above which was fitted a bridge deck with handrails. Two jack screws enabled the deck to be raised or lowered in relation to the pontoon, so that it remained at approximately the same height, whatever the state of the tide. On the eastern bank, Scarr constructed a variable-height landing, but the landing on the west bank was constructed by Beverley Council, and was fixed. Scarr campaigned to have a variable landing here as well, and was prepared to fund it, but his requests were always rejected. The fixed landing made access to the bridge difficult at high tides. When a boat needed to pass, the west end was freed, and the pontoon swung round to lie parallel to the bank, either upstream or downstream, depending on the state of the tide. It would then be winched back into position by a small barrel winch. At night the bridge was closed and moored beside the bank.

Responsibility for the bridge was taken over by Beverley Council before the Second World War. Its condition deteriorated, and in 1948, they attempted to replace it with a footbridge around  further upstream. Because the ferry rights had been in existence for more than 600 years, an Act of Parliament was needed, and this was thwarted by a petition containing 84 signatures, presented by the people of Weel to the House of Lords. Plans for a new lift bridge were drawn up, and it was opened on 19 October 1953.

In 1913, the Hull Bridge upstream of Beverley, which had caused so much disagreement in the 18th century until it had been replaced in 1801, was demolished by the County Council, who installed a steel rolling bridge in its place. Once the Tickton Bypass bridge had been built a short distance upstream, it no longer needed to carry road traffic, and it was replaced by a footbridge in 1976.

At the other end of the river, the Millennium Bridge was opened in 2001. There was once a ferry at this point, before 1865, which gave access to the Victoria Dock, opened in 1850. South Bridge replaced the ferry in 1865, making it easier for workers to reach the dock. The swing footbridge was closed in 1934, but was not demolished until 1944.

Water quality
The Environment Agency measure the water quality of the river systems in England. Each is given an overall ecological status, which may be one of five levels: high, good, moderate, poor and bad. There are several components that are used to determine this, including biological status, which looks at the quantity and varieties of invertebrates, angiosperms and fish. Chemical status, which compares the concentrations of various chemicals against known safe concentrations, is rated good or fail.

The water quality of the River Hull system was as follows in 2016.

The reasons for the quality being less than good include sewage discharge and physical modification of the channel.

Points of interest

See also

Rivers of the United Kingdom

Bibliography

References

External links

 Tour of the River Hull by boat
 Google Maps Satellite View
 Video footage of the Hull Tidal Barrier and the Millennium Bridge

River
Rivers of the East Riding of Yorkshire
River navigations in the United Kingdom
Land drainage in the United Kingdom
1Hull